Lyne may refer to:

Places 
 Division of Lyne, an electoral division in New South Wales, Australia
 Lyne, Denmark, a town in southwest Denmark
 Lyne, Surrey a village in southern England
 River Lyne, a river of Cumbria in England
 Lyne, Scottish Borders, a small village in Scotland

Other uses 
 Lyne (surname) (including a list of people with the name)
 Lyne Renée (born 1979), Belgian actress
 Lyne Place, a Regency house in Surrey, England, part of Holloway Sanatorium

See also 
 Ashton-under-Lyne, a market town in the Metropolitan Borough of Tameside, Greater Manchester, England
 Lynn (disambiguation)
 Lynne (disambiguation)
 Ó Laighin, an Irish surname sometimes anglicized as Lyne